Birce Akalay (born 19 June 1984) is a Turkish actress.

Akalay, who had her breakthrough with a role in the TV series Yer Gök Aşk as Havva, has appeared in various TV series and movies to this date. In 2017, she was cast in the play Yedi Kocalı Hürmüz, directed by Müjdat Gezen. In 2020, she had a leading role in the play Keşanlı Ali Destanı and portrayed the character of "Zilha". At the same time, she continued her career on television with a leading role in Star TV's series Babil, which premiered in January 2020.

Life and career 
Akalay was born on 19 June 1984 in Istanbul. She started ballet at the age of four and was injured at the age of sixteen. She graduated from theatre department of Pera Fine Arts High School in 2003. She then enrolled in Istanbul University with a major in theatre analysis but left the school at third grade to pursue her dream of becoming a theatre actress. Since she had reached the age of twenty, she lost the chance to win a place in state conservatory but instead won a seat in Haliç University Conservatory for theatre studies and finished her education there. As of 2020, she is a lecturer at Haliç University's theatre department, teaching acting courses. In 2004, she completed in Miss Turkey and finished in the 3rd place. Subsequently, she represented her country in Miss Europe. In 2007, she made her television debut with a supporting role in the TV series Asi. She had her first cinematic role in the same year with a part in the movie Son Ders: Aşk ve Üniversite. She got her first leading role in television with the series Kader, playing the character of Lamia, and was then cast in the series Senin Uğruna in the same year.

After playing supporting roles in Alayına İsyan and Kış Masalı in 2009, her breakthrough came with her role as Havva in 2010 series Yer Gök Aşk, which was well received by critics and fans. In 2013, she joined the cast of Ben Onu Çok Sevdim , portraying the character of Ayhan. She continued her TV career with roles in Küçük Ağa (2014–2015), Evli ve Öfkeli (2015–2016), youth series Hayat Bazen Tatlıdır (2016–2017) and Siyah Beyaz Aşk (2017–2018). After playing a leading role in the TV series Ağlama Anne in late 2018, she didn't appear in any productions for 1 year.

In the meantime, she started teaching as a lecturer at Haliç University Theater Department and took part in the music program Benimle Söyle as the chief judge. In January 2020, she began portraying İlay in Star TV's series Babil. Akalay has also continued her career on stage and in 2020 appeared as "Zilha" in the play Keşanlı Ali Destanı. Her cousin, Barış Murat Yağcı, is also an actor.

Filmography

Film

Television

TV programs

Theatre

Awards and nominations

References

External links 
 
 

Turkish film actresses
Turkish television actresses
1984 births
Actresses from Istanbul
Living people
21st-century Turkish actresses